From Vegas to Macau, also known as The Man From Macau, is a Hong Kong-Chinese crime comedy film directed by Wong Jing. The film stars Chow Yun-fat, Nicholas Tse, Chapman To and Jing Tian. The film was released during 2014 Chinese New Year.

A sequel titled From Vegas to Macau II was released on February 19, 2015.

Plot
Benz, his son "Cool" and nephew Ngau-Ngau are part of a team of vigilantes who rob gangsters at night and distribute the loot to the needy. However, his wife is suffering from cancer and knows nothing of their activities. Unbeknownst to all of them, Benz's stepson Lionel, a police officer, is on a deep undercover assignment as an employee of a multinational company called DOA. It is later revealed that DOA is merely the corporate front of a large criminal syndicate and is run by the ruthless Mr. Ko. Lionel, who had a camera implanted onto a contact lens which he wore so the police could track the syndicate's activities and eventually nab them.

Meanwhile, Benz reunites with his old friend Ken, known as the "Magic Hand". Ngau-Ngau becomes infatuated with Ken's daughter Rainbow and is determined to win her affection, even though Ken eventually makes it known that he prefers "Cool" to date his daughter and Rainbow repeatedly rebuffs Ngau-Ngau's efforts. Lionel realizes his cover has been blown and hides the contact lens in a stuffed teddy bear at home without his family's knowledge. Ngau-Ngau gives the bear to Rainbow when he and "Cool" visit Ken's house. Mr. Ko sends an assassin to Lionel's flat, only to find Benz, who has just returned home. Benz is beaten and tortured and ends up in a coma while Lionel's body is found later, also bearing torture marks.

Police detectives from China, Hong Kong and Macau decide to enlist the help of Ken to take down the wily and cunning Mr. Ko. Ken challenges Mr. Ko to a gambling match in hopes of provoking him into making a mistake. During the match he discovers that DOA's assassins have attacked his house and Rainbow, "Cool" and Ngau-Ngau are inside.

Rainbow is put inside a glass tank, which has gas in it. During the match, Ken reveals that he had undergone through a surgery to implant a card sensor into his fingernail which allows the details of a certain card to be fed into his brain. The people following Mr. Ko start a revolution against him after watching Lionel Messi of Barcelona score against Real Madrid, winning them. After killing them all, Mr. Ko tries finding Ken. Ken starts shooting cards in retaliation. "Cool", is revealed to be wearing the mask of one of Mr. Ko's crew, whom had secretly diverted the ship back towards the waters, which police are now making their way to. While making their way towards the top, "Cool" and Rainbow meets the Assassin. "Cool" and the Assassin fight, which "Cool" ends him off with a few punches to his face, making him look like a duck.

Mr. Ko starts to escape, only to be met by Ken. Ken now mercilessly shoots cards at Mr. Ko, striking him multiple times. Mr. Ko is later subdued by him, and arrested by the Police.

While Ken is doing the disciple rituals with "Cool" on the first day of the Lunar New Year at his place, "Cool" receives a call from a mysterious someone, who also shows interest to take Cool as his disciple. Ken questions Cool who is more qualified to impart his skills to him. At this moment, the doors swing open. A man in his black suit, playing with his jade ring walks into the scene. "I believe I am qualified to take him as my disciple." This man was no other than God of Gamblers Ko Chun (from the God of Gamblers series) himself.

Cast
Chow Yun-fat as Ken 石一坚 / "God of Gamblers Ko Chun" 赌神高进
Nicholas Tse as Cool 晒冷 "冷竟"
Chapman To as Ngau-Ngau 牛必勝 "牛牛"
Jing Tian as Detective Luo Xin
Kimmy Tong as Rainbow 阿彩
Philip Ng as Lionel
Gao Hu as Mr. Ko
Annie Wu as Susan
Benz Hui as Benz
Zhang Jin as DOA's bodyguard/assassin
Michael Wong as Detective
Sammy Sum as Ken's enforcer
Tony Ho as Mr. Ko's enforcer
Maria Cordero as Siu Wan
Wong Man-wai as Benz's wife
Philip Keung as Ma Sheung-fat
Winnie Leung as Mr. Ko's female enforcer
Candy Yuen as Mr. Ko's female enforcer
May Chan as Ken's cousin
Wong Chun-tong as Brother Man
Yu Chi-ming as Uncle Wah
Natalie Meng as Ngau-Ngau's fake wife
Michelle Hu as Mr. Ko's female enforcer
Philippe Joly as Mr. Ko's American delegate
Roberto Losada as undercover Macau Police

Production
The film's blessing ceremony press conference was held on 28 July 2013 at TVB City where it was attended by the cast alongside Mega-Vision Pictures representatives director Wong Jing and producer Andrew Lau, Television Broadcasts Limited production manager Virginia Lok, Polybona Films CEO Yu Dong, Golden Pictures Entertainment representative Yun Chi Yuen and Sun Entertainment Culture representative Paco Wong. Production started immediately after. The film's premise will be set in Macau.

Box office
The film grossed RMB24.8 million (US$4.09 million) in its opening day in China, with a total opening gross of US$12.5 million. It had grossed a total of RMB523,490,000 (US$84,570,000) in China at the end of its run. In Hong Kong, it has grossed a total of  HK$33,557,657 (US$4,324,184). It earned a total of  internationally.

Sequel

The sequel From Vegas to Macau II was released in 2015 with Chow Yun-fat and Kimmy Tong reprising their roles as Ken and Rainbow. Nick Cheung replaced Nicholas Tse as Chow's new protégé and Carina Lau also joined the cast.

References

External links
 
 
 

2014 films
2010s crime comedy films
2010s Cantonese-language films
Chinese crime comedy films
Films directed by Wong Jing
Films set in Hong Kong
Films shot in Macau
Films about gambling
Hong Kong action comedy films
Hong Kong crime comedy films
Polybona Films films
2014 comedy films
2010s Mandarin-language films
2010s Hong Kong films